Digital Reasoning is an American company headquartered in Franklin, Tennessee. It offers cognitive computing services to intelligence agencies, financial institutions and healthcare organizations in the United States.

History
Digital Reasoning was founded in 2000 by Tim Estes, a Knoxville-born philosophy senior at the University of Virginia. It is headquartered in Franklin, Tennessee, with offices in Washington, D.C., New York City and London. As of August 2015, its Franklin headquarters had 100 employees, 30 of whom had top secret clearance.

The firm presented its Synthesys software to the United States Army in 2002. They signed a contract with the National Ground Intelligence Center, a subsidiary of the United States Army Intelligence and Security Command, in 2004. Synthesys was used to track enemies in the War in Afghanistan from 2004 onwards. Six years later, in 2010, it received funding from In-Q-Tel, the venture capital firm of the Central Intelligence Agency.

Since 2012, the firm has sold its Synthesys software to banks and hedge funds, including UBS and Point72 Asset Management. Financial institutions use Synthesys to scan internal e-mails within a given company in search of unfamiliar patterns between employees, in terms of word-specific content, frequency and interpersonal connections. The aim is to predict fraud before it occurs.

In 2014, the firm received US$750,000 from the Tennessee Angel Fund of TNInvestco, a US$200 million fund from the State of Tennessee. It also received US$24 million from Credit Suisse Asset Management's NEXT Investors as well as Goldman Sachs. Other investors include the Partnership for New York City and the Nashville Capital Network.

In March 2018, the firm received US$30 million in funding led by BNP Paribas and joined by Barclays and Square Capital. Previous investors Goldman Sachs, Nasdaq, Lemhi Ventures, HCA, and the Partnership Fund for New York City also joined the round.

In February 2019, Macquarie Group invested an undisclosed amount in Digital Reasoning. The companies stated plans to partner together to explore new ways to apply Digital Reasoning's technology to the finance industry.

In April 2020, company founder Tim Estes resumes his role as co-CEO. He will serve alongside Brook Hazelton, an existing investor in Digital Reasoning. Estes will handle the company's overall corporate strategy, while Hazelton leads the company's commercial operations.

References

External links

Defunct software companies of the United States
Companies based in Franklin, Tennessee
Software companies established in 2000
Technology companies established in 2000